Dimitrios Katsivelis (alternate spelling: Dimitris) (Greek: Δημήτρης Κατσίβελης; born October 1, 1991) is a Greek professional basketball player for Kolossos Rodou of the Greek Basket League. He is a 1.98 m (6 ft 6") tall, 96 kg (212 lb.) point guard.

Professional career
Katsivelis started his career playing at the semi-professional level (the 3rd-tier level of Greek basketball) with Mantoulidis in the Greek B League.

He began his professional career when he signed with the Greek League club Olympiacos Piraeus in 2010. With Olympiacos, he won the EuroLeague and Greek League championships, in 2012. With Olympiacos, he also won the 2012–13 season championship of the EuroLeague, and the Greek League championship in 2015.

On August 5, 2015, he signed with AEK Athens. He moved to the Kazakh club Astana, of the VTB United League, for the 2016–17 season.

On July 1, 2018, Katsivelis was announced by Promitheas Patras, where he subsequently spent two seasons. He averaged 3.7 points, 2.2 rebounds and 1.1 assists per game in the shortened 2019-2020 campaign.

On August 8, 2020, he agreed to return to AEK. 

On July 24, 2021, Katsivelis officially moved to Peristeri. On April 18, 2022, he was suspended for the rest of the season, along with teammate Linos Chrysikopoulos, after they both fell out of favor with the club's new head coach Milan Tomić. In 17 league games, he averaged 6.7 points, 2.1 rebounds and 3 assists per contest.

On August 25, 2022, Katsivelis signed with Kolossos Rodou, reuniting with both Chrysikopoulos and his Astana coach Ilias Papatheodorou.

National team career

Greek junior national team
With Greece's junior national teams, Katsivelis won the gold medal at the 2008 FIBA Europe Under-18 Championship, the silver medal at the 2009 FIBA Under-19 World Cup, and the silver medal at the 2010 FIBA Europe Under-20 Championship.

Greek senior national team
Katsivelis became a member of the senior men's Greek national basketball team in 2017. He played at the 2019 FIBA World Cup qualification.

Awards and accomplishments

Pro career
2× EuroLeague Champion: (2012, 2013)
2× Greek League Champion: (2012, 2015)
FIBA Intercontinental Cup Champion: (2013)
Kazakhstan League: Champion (2017)
Kazakhstan Cup: Winner (2017)
Greek League All-Star :(2020)

Greek junior national team
2008 FIBA Europe Under-18 Championship: 
2009 FIBA Under-19 World Cup: 
2010 FIBA Europe Under-20 Championship:

References

External links
 Dimitrios Katisvelis at baskethotel.com
 Dimitrios Katsivelis at draftexpress.com
 Dimitrios Katsivelis at esake.gr 
 Dimitrios Katsivelis at eurobasket.com
 Dimitrios Katsivelis at euroleague.net
 Dimitrios Katsivelis at fiba.com (archive)
 Dimitrios Katsivelis at fiba.com (game center)
 Dimitrios Katisvelis at vtb-league.com
 Dimitrios Katsivelis at scoresway.com

1991 births
Living people
AEK B.C. players
BC Astana players
Greek expatriate basketball people in Kazakhstan
Greek men's basketball players
Kolossos Rodou B.C. players
Olympiacos B.C. players
P.A.O.K. BC players
Peristeri B.C. players
Point guards
Promitheas Patras B.C. players
Basketball players from Thessaloniki